"That's the Way I Wanna Rock 'n' Roll" is a single by Australian hard rock band AC/DC. The song appeared on their 1988 album Blow Up Your Video as the second track. A live version of this song can be found on the band's live album, Live: 2 CD Collector's Edition. The B-side of the single was "Borrowed Time".

In 2005, the music video, directed by Peter Sinclair, Brian Grant, and Jiff Morrison, was released on Family Jewels. The video was shot at their show at the National Exhibition Centre in Birmingham and included fans carrying red cardboard Gibson SG guitars.

Author Paul Stenning described the song as the strongest from the album.

7" vinyl track listing

12" Vinyl maxi-single track listing

5" CD single track listing

Charts

Personnel
Brian Johnson – vocals
Angus Young – lead guitar
Malcolm Young – rhythm guitar, backing vocals
Cliff Williams – bass guitar, backing vocals
Simon Wright – drums

References

AC/DC songs
1988 singles
Songs written by Brian Johnson
Songs written by Angus Young
Songs written by Malcolm Young
Song recordings produced by Harry Vanda
Song recordings produced by George Young (rock musician)
1988 songs
Atlantic Records singles

pt:That's The Way I Wanna Rock 'n' Roll